Millbrook Proving Ground is an English vehicle testing centre located at Millbrook, Bedfordshire. One of the largest vehicle testing centres in Europe, it is near to the M1 and Bedford.

History
Modelled on the Milford Proving Ground operated by General Motors (GM) in Michigan, Millbrook was opened in the 1960s by the GM subsidiary Bedford before passing over to Vauxhall. Due to the geographical needs of a full testing centre, including both hills and flat land, the traditional choice of a former Royal Air Force airfield was ruled out and many sites around the UK were surveyed before the location at Millbrook was decided upon, especially due to having the benefit of being close to Vauxhall's production site at Luton.

Construction of the Proving Ground began in 1968, and once the facility opened in 1970 it acted as the testing site for many European GM models from, among others, the Vauxhall and Bedford companies.

With Bedford withdrawing from the bus and truck markets in December 1986, Millbrook was put up for sale by GM. In 1988 the site was transferred to a new company, Millbrook Proving Ground Limited as part of Lotus and offered its facilities to non-GM companies. With the sale of Lotus in 1993 Millbrook was transferred to GM Holdings UK Limited, as an independently-managed company which diversified into all aspects of vehicle testing including emission control. In October 2013, the proving ground was purchased by Rutland Partners. In September 2016 it was sold to Spectris. In December 2020 it was announced that Millbrook would be divested from the Spectris portfolio of companies and acquired by UTAC CERAM for £133 million. The divestment was completed on the 2 February 2021.

Current facilities

The centre provides vehicle test and development facilities including:
 Vehicle and system assessment
 Powertrain development
 Safety testing.
 Climate controlled chamber that can simulate conditions from -20 to +50°C
These are staffed by engineering teams who work with manufacturers on their test and development programmes.

Millbrook has a wide range of types of test tracks. The most prominent are the:
 Hill Route – divided into three sections or loops which contain progressively steeper gradients as well as many tight corners. Sometimes seen in motoring television programmes, for example Top Gear, particularly the "ski-jump" where it is very easy for vehicles to become airborne.
 Outer and Inner Handling (or City Course) circuits – extremely technical twisty circuits used for extreme testing of vehicle dynamic characteristics.
 High Speed Bowl – a two-mile banked circuit used for higher speed testing.

The proving ground maintains a high standard of security and secrecy to protect the commercial interests of its customers. Public access is not generally permitted and the facility is hidden from view. Limited supervised access to the facilities is available through some driver training organisations.

Film and television
Millbrook has been used in the filming of many television programs and films including:
Casino Royale
Top Gear:
Series 6, episode 2
Series 8, episode 1
Series 10, episode 7
Series 12, episode 1
Series 28, episode 2
The Grand Tour:
Series 3, episode 9
 Chris Moyles Show - Car Roulette Competition
 Wheeler Dealers
Fifth Gear

External links
Official website
Collection of historic documents on the Millbrook Proving Ground

References

Automotive industry in the United Kingdom
Automotive testing agencies
Buildings and structures in Bedfordshire
General Motors
Science and technology in Bedfordshire
1970 establishments in England
Road test tracks